Pummared Kladkleeb (born September 18, 1987)) is a former professional footballer from Thailand. currently plays for Nakhon Pathom United in the Thai League 2.

External links
https://int.soccerway.com/players/pummared-kladkleeb/440107/

1987 births
Living people
Pummared Kladkleeb
Association football midfielders
Pummared Kladkleeb
Pummared Kladkleeb
Pummared Kladkleeb
Pummared Kladkleeb